Ottenburg is a village in the municipality of Huldenberg in the Flemish part of Belgium in the province of Flemish Brabant close to the language border.

Populated places in Flemish Brabant
Huldenberg